The Precision 185 CB is an American sailing dinghy that was designed by Jim Taylor as a day sailer and first built in 2001.

The design was named 2003 Sailing World's Boat of the Year.

There is also a keel version of the design, the Precision 185.

Production
The design was built by Precision Boat Works in Palmetto, Florida, United States, between 2001 and 2018, but it is now out of production.

Design
The Precision 185 CB is a recreational sailboat, built predominantly of fiberglass, with wood trim. It has a fractional sloop rig, a raked stem, an open plumb transom, a transom-hung rudder controlled by a tiller and a retractable centerboard. It displaces .

For sailing downwind the design may be equipped with a symmetrical spinnaker. Hiking straps are also optional.

Operational history
In a 2002 review Alan Andrews wrote, "the Precision 185 was voted Best Value for its combination of good sailing characteristics, substantial construction, and reasonable cost. First and foremost this boat performs well; yet it shouldn't intimidate even entry-level sailors."

See also
List of sailing boat types

References

External links

Dinghies
2000s sailboat type designs
Sailing yachts
Sailboat type designs by Jim Taylor Yacht Designs
Sailboat types built by Precision Boat Works